The conductor Sir Georg Solti recorded throughout his career for the Decca Record Company. During the 1950s and 1960s Decca had an alliance with RCA Records in the US and some of Solti's recordings were first issued on the RCA label.

Overview
Solti's first recordings were as a piano accompanist, playing at sessions in Zürich for the violinist Georg Kulenkampff in 1947. Decca's senior producer, Victor Olof, did not much admire Solti as a conductor (nor did Walter Legge, Olof's opposite number at EMI's Columbia Records), but Olof's younger colleague at Decca John Culshaw held Solti in high regard. With Culshaw, and later James Walker, producing his recordings, Solti's career as a recording artist flourished.

Solti's most celebrated recording was Wagner's Der Ring des Nibelungen made in Vienna, with Culshaw producing, between 1958 and 1965. It has twice been voted the greatest recording ever made, the first poll being of readers of Gramophone magazine in 1999, and the second of professional music critics in 2011, carried out for the BBC.

For Decca, Solti made more than 250 recordings, including 45 complete opera sets. Among the international honours given for his recordings were 31 Grammy awards – more than any other recording artist, whether classical or popular.

Discography
In entries below for operas, only the singers of the leading roles are listed. Where Solti appears as pianist rather than a conductor his name is given in the soloists column. Recording dates are shown by year followed by month, to enable sorting, using the arrows in the column headings.

Abbreviations:
BPO – Berlin Philharmonic
CSC – Chicago Symphony Chorus
CSO – Chicago Symphony Orchestra
LPC – London Philharmonic Choir
LPO – London Philharmonic Orchestra
LSC – London Symphony Chorus
LSO – London Symphony Orchestra
ROHC – Royal Opera House Chorus
ROHO – Royal Opera House Orchestra
VPO – Vienna Philharmonic
Awards:
G - Grammy Award
N  - Grammy Nominee

Notes

References

Further reading

External links

Discographies of classical conductors